Happy Now? is a British play by Lucinda Coxon, first staged at the National Theatre, London in 2008.

Plot
After a conversation with Michael, a middle aged businessman, at a conference hotel, Kitty begins to wonder what life is really all about as she desperately tries to balance family life with personal freedom and fidelity with a trying job in marketing for a cancer charity. Meanwhile, at home, Johnny (her husband) makes out she's got it easy compared to his hectic schedule as a newly trained teacher – a job he ironically took on to lead a more laid-back lifestyle. Kitty's parents are drifting further and further apart as her mother, June, tries to keep Kitty on her side of the feud. Miles and Bea – Kitty and Johnny's friends – are also struggling to hold it together as Miles is slowly becoming more and more gripped by alcoholism whilst Carl, another friend, seems to have the ideal lifestyle with his new lifeguard boyfriend Antonio.

Original production
The original production was staged at the Cottesloe Theatre, National Theatre, London on 24 January 2008 and played until 10 May 2008. The production was directed by Thea Sharrock and featured the following cast:
 Michael – Stanley Townsend
 Kitty – Olivia Williams
 Johnny – Jonathan Cullen
 Miles – Dominic Rowan
 Bea – Emily Joyce
 Carl – Stuart McQuarrie
 June – Anne Reid

The technical crew were as follows:
 Production Manager – Igor
 Designer – Jonathan Fensom
 Lighting Designer – Oliver Fenwick
 Sound Designer – Paul Arditti
 Fight Director – Terry King
 Company Voice Work – Kate Godfrey
 Assistant Director – Laura Farnworth
 Stage Manager – Fiona Bardsley
 Deputy Stage Manager – Valerie Fox
 Assistant Stage Manager – Sophie Milne
 Costume Supervisor – Jane Gooday
 Prop Supervisor – Kirsten Shiell
 Assistant to the Lighting Designer – Paul Knott
 Assistant Production Manager – Simon Khamara
 Design Associate – Ben Austin
 Video Images – Gemma Carrington
 Production Photographer – Stephen Cummiskey

Subsequent productions
Yale Repertory Theater
 25 October – 25 November 2008
 Directed by Liz Diamond
Cast:
 Michael – David Andrew Macdonald
 Kitty – Mary Bacon
 Johnny – Kelly AuCoin
 Miles – Quentin Mare
 Bea – Katharine Powell
 Carl – Brian Keane
 June – Joan MacIntosh

Creative Team:
 Scenic Designer – Sarah Pearline
 Lighting Designer – Matt Frey
 Sound Designer – David Budries
 Costume Designer – Heidi Hanson
 Fight Director – David DeBesse
 Vocal and Dialect Coach – Pamela Prather
 Stage Manager – Amanda Spooner
 Casting – Tara Rubin Casting
 Production Dramaturg – Sarah Bishop-Stone
 Assistant Director – Christopher Mirto

Primary Stages Theater
 26 January – 6 March 2010
 Directed by Liz Diamond
Cast:
 Michael – C. J. Wilson
 Kitty – Mary Bacon
 Johnny – Kelly AuCoin
 Miles – Quentin Mare
 Bea – Kate Arrington
 Carl – Brian Keane
 June – Joan MacIntosh

Creative Team:
 Scenic Designer – Narelle Sissons
 Lighting Designer – Matt Frey
 Sound Designer – David Budries
 Costume Designer – Jennifer Moeller
 Fight Director – David DeBesse
 Props Master – Faye Armon
 Projection Designer – Jeff Sugg
 Associate Projection Designer – Daniel Brodie
 Vocal and Dialect Coach – Pamela Prather
 Stage Manager – Matthew Melchiorre
 Assistant Stage Manager – Amanda Spooner
 Casting – Stephanie Klapper Casting

Reception
Happy Now? won the Writer's Guild Best New Play Award and the Susan Smith Blackburn Special Commendation Award. In New York, it was nominated for the Drama Desk Award for Outstanding Play.

The play was very well-received, with The Independent, Whatsonstage.com awarding it four stars and the Daily Telegraph calling it "a richly rewarding gem... the best new play to have arrived on a British stage for at least a year'.

The New York premiere saw the play hailed as a "tart, entertaining and ultimately haunting comedy".

References

External links
 National Theatre – Happy Now official website

2008 plays
British plays